Wynn Firth Hawkins (February 20, 1936 – February 11, 2021) was an American professional baseball player, scout and executive. During his active career, he was a right-handed pitcher who was signed by the Cleveland Indians before the 1955 season, and played in the Major Leagues with the Indians from 1960 to 1962. He attended Baldwin Wallace University, where he was a star in basketball.

Hawkins was perhaps best known for giving up Ted Williams's 500th home run (June 17, 1960). He appeared in 48 games (with 30 starts) during his three seasons with the Tribe. During his career, Hawkins gave up 99 walks in just 202 innings pitched, for a BB/9IP of 4.40, higher than the American League average at that time. He finished his career with a total of 12 wins, 13 losses, 1 save, 11 games finished, and an ERA of 4.17.

Career highlights for Hawkins include pitching the first 11 innings of a 12-inning game, giving up one unearned run and defeating the Detroit Tigers 2–1 (April 26, 1960), a five-hit, complete-game victory over the Boston Red Sox, winning 10–1 (April 30, 1961), and a two-hit, complete-game shutout against the Minnesota Twins (May 21, 1961).

After his pitching career, Hawkins was a scout for the Indians, and served as the team's traveling secretary as well as in sales. Hawkins died on February 11, 2021, at his home in Canfield, Ohio.

References

External links

1936 births
2021 deaths
Baldwin Wallace Yellow Jackets baseball players
Baseball players from Ohio
Cleveland Indians players
Cleveland Indians scouts
Fargo-Moorhead Twins players
Fayetteville Highlanders players
Jacksonville Suns players
Major League Baseball pitchers
Mobile Bears players
People from East Palestine, Ohio
Portland Beavers players
Reading Indians players
Toronto Maple Leafs (International League) players